Fernanda Yara da Silva (born 15 August 1986) is a Brazilian Paralympic athlete who competes in international level events. She is a double Parapan American Games bronze medalist and has participated at the 2008 Summer Paralympics.

Da Silva's left hand was amputated at birth due to myoma.

References

External links
 

1986 births
Living people
People from Petrolina
Paralympic athletes of Brazil
Brazilian female sprinters
Athletes (track and field) at the 2008 Summer Paralympics
Sportspeople from Pernambuco
21st-century Brazilian women